The 2022 Billie Jean King Cup Play-offs were held from 11 to 12 November 2022.

Teams
Sixteen teams played for eight spots in the 2023 qualifying round, in series decided on a home and away basis.

These sixteen teams were:
 6 losing teams from qualifying round.
 7 winning teams from their Group I zone.
 2 later promoted teams from Zonal Group I (Serbia and Mexico) to fill the vacancy of Russia and Belarus.
 1 later promoted team from Zonal Group I (Austria) to fill the vacancy of Great Britain, whose was announced as Final hosts.

The eight winners of this round qualify for the 2023 Qualifying Round while the eight losers will contest their respective regional Group I event in 2023.

Seeded teams
  (#2)
  (#10)
  (#13)
  (#16)
  (#18)
  (#19)
  (#20)
  (#21)

Unseeded teams
  (#22)
  (#23)
  (#24)
  (#26)
  (#29)
  (#33)
  (#36)
  (#37)

Results summary

Results

France vs. Netherlands

Croatia vs. Germany

Romania vs. Hungary

Austria vs. Latvia

Japan vs. Ukraine

Argentina vs. Brazil

Slovenia vs. China

Mexico vs. Serbia

References

External links
Official website

Play-offs
Billie Jean King Cup Play-offs
Billie Jean King Cup Play-offs
Billie Jean King Cup Play-offs
Billie Jean King Cup Play-offs